Barnes railway station is a Grade II listed station in the London Borough of Richmond upon Thames, in southwest London, and is in Travelcard Zone 3. The station and all trains serving it are operated by South Western Railway.

It is the nearest station for Queen Mary's Hospital, Roehampton Club, Rosslyn Park F.C. grounds,  and the University of Roehampton.

History

The station at Barnes was opened on 27 July 1846, when the line to Richmond was built. When the first section of the Hounslow Loop Line was opened on 22 August 1849, Barnes became a junction station.

Grade II listed, it was designed by the architect John Thomas Emmett in 1846 and is the only survivor of four brick-built Tudor Gothic-style stations on the Richmond branch, the others being Putney, Mortlake, and Richmond. The ticket office, adjacent to Platform 1, is now privately owned.

The Barnes rail crash, in which 13 people were killed and 41 injured, occurred near this station on 1 December 1955.

The station is briefly seen at the end of 'Miracle in Crooked Lane', episode five of the third series of Jonathan Creek.

Platforms
The station has four platforms. 
Platform 1: Local to London Waterloo (Next station Putney)
Platform 2: Express to London Waterloo (Trains do not generally stop)
Platform 3: Local to Hounslow (both routes), Teddington via Richmond & Weybridge via Brentford (Next station Mortlake or Barnes Bridge)
Platform 4: Express to Windsor Riverside & Reading (Trains do not generally stop)

Platforms 1 & 2 are swapped on Sundays. On the London side of the station, there are four tracks; one pair turns off along the Loop Line here.

There are 2 ticket machines by Platform 1. The platforms are accessible by a public footbridge, which connect to the bus stops, Station Road and a path to Roehampton. There are station facilities on the central island, however, these are not often open.

Services

The typical off-peak service from the station is:

2 tph to Wimbledon, calling at Mortlake, North Sheen, Richmond, St Margarets, Twickenham, Kingston,  and

Connections
London Buses routes 33, 72, 265 and 969 serve the station.

References

External links
Freeman, Leslie. The Coming of the Railway, Barnes and Mortlake History Society, June 1996

Barnes, London
Former London and South Western Railway stations
Railway stations in Great Britain opened in 1846
Railway stations served by South Western Railway
Railway stations in the London Borough of Richmond upon Thames
William Tite railway stations
1846 establishments in England
Grade II listed buildings in the London Borough of Richmond upon Thames
Grade II listed railway stations